Aquí ("Here") is the title of the debut studio album by Mexican singer-songwriter Julieta Venegas, released on March 24, 1997. It was well received by the public.  The two singles released were "De Mis Pasos" and "Cómo Sé".

Track listing
The album comprises 12 songs, all written by Venegas.

Singles
De mis pasos
Cómo sé

1997 debut albums
Julieta Venegas albums
Albums produced by Gustavo Santaolalla
Sony Music Mexico albums